All Hail Bright Futures is the third album from Northern Irish band And So I Watch You From Afar, released on 15 March 2013. It was produced and mixed by Rocky O'Reilly.

Record label Sargent House uploaded a track from the album entitled "Like a Mouse" on 7 December 2012.

And So I Watch You From Afar revealed the track listings on its Bandcamp page on 17 December 2012.

Track listing
All songs are written and composed by And So I Watch You From Afar.

Digital bonus tracks

Personnel

Rory Friers – guitar
Niall Kennedy – guitar
Jonathan Adger – bass guitar
Chris Wee – drums, percussion
Rocky O'Reilly– production, mixing
Lee McMahon – engineering
Robin Schmidt – mastering

References

2013 albums
And So I Watch You from Afar albums